Franz Pfaffenzeller (? in Munich – 1880)  was a German entomologist who specialised in Lepidoptera especially the Microlepidoptera of the Alps.
His collections are held by  the Natural History Museum, Berlin

Pfaffenzeller wrote 
 Franz Pfaffenzeller (1857) Ueber Euprepia flava. Entomologische Zeitung, Stettin - 18 84-90, 1 Taf.
 Franz Pfaffenzeller (1860) Ueber Gastropacha Arbusculae. Entomologische Zeitung Stettin  21: 126 - 129.
 Franz Pfaffenzeller (1867): Gelechia Petasitis, n. sp. Entomologische Zeitung 28 (1-3): 79. Stettin.
 Franz Pfaffenzeller (1870) Neue Tineinen Stettin Ent. Ztg 31 (7-9) : 320-324

New taxa described include Scrobipalpa samadensis (Pfaffenzeller, 1870) and Scrobipalpopsis petasitis (Pfaffenzeller, 1867). His name is honoured in Callisto pfaffenzelleri (Frey, 1856)

References 
 Gaedike, R.; Groll, E. K. & Taeger, A. 2012: Bibliography of the entomological literature from the beginning until 1863 : online database – version 1.0 – Senckenberg Deutsches Entomologisches Institut.
Groll, E. K. 2017: Biographies of the Entomologists of the World. – Online database, version 8, Senckenberg Deutsches Entomologisches Institut, Müncheberg – URL: sdei.senckenberg.de/biografies

1880 deaths
Year of birth missing
German lepidopterists